Caroline Wensink (born 4 August 1984 in Enschede, Overijssel) is a volleyball player from the Netherlands, who plays as a middle-blocker. She was a member of the Dutch National Women's Team that won the gold medal at the 2007 FIVB World Grand Prix in Ningbo, PR China.

Caroline won the Best Blocker award in the 2012 European League, as her team ended in 4th place.

Wensink is the cousin of Judith Pietersen, with whom she has also played in the Dutch national team.

Awards

Individuals
 2012 European League "Best Blocker"

References

 FIVB Profile

1984 births
Living people
Dutch women's volleyball players
Sportspeople from Enschede
Middle blockers
Expatriate volleyball players in Italy
Dutch expatriate sportspeople in Italy
Expatriate volleyball players in Germany
Dutch expatriate sportspeople in Germany
Expatriate volleyball players in Poland
Dutch expatriate sportspeople in Poland
Expatriate volleyball players in Azerbaijan
Dutch expatriate sportspeople in Azerbaijan